Robert Blundell (19 April 1896 – 11 February 1940) was an Australian cricketer. He played five first-class matches for Western Australia between 1921/22 and 1924/25.

References

External links
 

1896 births
1940 deaths
Australian cricketers
Western Australia cricketers
Cricketers from Perth, Western Australia